The Clarendon ministry was forged out of the royalist camp of Charles II, who was returned to the throne (the English Restoration) in 1660. Two years previously, Lord Hyde (later Earl of Clarendon) had been appointed Lord Chancellor, and in 1660, he was joined by several other powerful statesmen, including the heir presumptive of the English throne, the Duke of York. After the Second Anglo-Dutch War, however, Charles lost confidence in his ministers, and in 1667, five statesmen took cooperative power in the Cabal ministry.

Lord Clarendon was impeached by the House of Commons and forced to flee; the Duke of Albemarle sold his position to George Villiers, 2nd Duke of Buckingham; and Sir George Carteret simply left his position, eventually being forced out of the House two years later.

Committee for Foreign Affairs
The Privy Council Committee for Foreign Affairs served as the ministry; other significant statesmen not in the committee are listed in the next section. As the name of the ministry would suggest, Lord Clarendon (earlier Lord Hyde) was, in effect, the leader of the government.

Ministers not in committee

Political history of England
English ministries
1660s in England
1660 establishments in England
1667 disestablishments in England
Ministries of Charles II of England